Hearts Content National Scenic Area is a tract of old-growth forest in Warren County, northwestern Pennsylvania. It represents one of the few remaining old-growth forests in the northeastern United States that contain white pine. The area is protected as a National Scenic Area within the Allegheny National Forest.

History
While many of the region's forests were being clear-cut, the Wheeler and Dusenbury Lumber Company held the  tract of old-growth forest at Heart's Content from 1897 until 1922, when they deeded it to the United States Forest Service. The forest became a National Natural Landmark in 1973.

Scientific study
H.J. Lutz's 1930 study of Hearts Content was one of the earliest quantitative analyses of plant communities in an old-growth forest, and it remains influential in the field of ecology. Lutz concluded that the even-aged white pine stand established following a major disturbance in the 17th century, such as a fire (possibly set by Native Americans during the Beaver Wars); since then, the species has not reproduced under the closed canopy.  By relocating and resampling Lutz's original plots, Whitney documented 50 years of changes in the structure and composition of the stand. During this time, dense deer populations have reduced the regeneration of many tree and herb species.

Vegetation
Hearts Content represents E. Lucy Braun's hemlock-white pine-northern hardwood forest type. American beech is also plentiful in the forest, but is affected by Beech bark scale. Hay-scented fern covers much of the understory due to overbrowsing by deer.

Recreation
Visitors can walk an easily accessible,  loop trail through the old-growth forest. A picnic area, campground and several other trailheads are nearby. A  cross-country ski trail passes through the area on old railroad grades. There are also numerous camps owned by private individuals in the area.

See also

 List of National Natural Landmarks in Pennsylvania
 List of old growth forests

References

External links 

Hearts Content Recreation Area (United States Forest Service)

Old-growth forests
National Natural Landmarks in Pennsylvania
National scenic areas
Protected areas established in 1934
Protected areas of Warren County, Pennsylvania
Allegheny National Forest